The Constitution of Portugal of 1911 (literally "Political Constitution of the Portuguese Republic") was the fourth constitution of Portugal and the first Republican constitution of the Country.

On March 11, 1911, the Provisional Government of the Portuguese Republic published a new electoral law (replacing the 1895 Law). The elections to the National Constituent Assembly took place on May 28, 1911. This electoral law greatly restricted the right to vote, compared to its predecessor.

226 Members of the Assembly were elected, most of whom were assigned to the Portuguese Republican Party, the protagonist of the Republican Revolution. The Assembly began its work on June 19, 1911. The President of the Assembly was Anselmo Braamcamp Freire. During the inaugural session, the Assembly declared the Monarchy abolished and reiterated the proscription of the Bragança family and recognizes all political acts of the Provisional Government, and thereafter elected a Commission to prepare a draft of the constitution.

The Constitution was approved on August 21, 1911.

Structure 
The Political Constitution of the Portuguese Republic of 1911 has only 87 articles grouped into seven titles, namely:
 Form of the Government and of the Territory of the Portuguese Nation
 Individual rights and guarantees
 Sovereignty and State Power
 Local administrative institutions
 Administration of the Overseas Provinces
 General Provisions
 Constitutional Revision

See also 
 Constitution of Portugal

First Portuguese Republic
Government of Portugal
Political history of Portugal
Law of Portugal
Portuguese Republic
Republicanism in Portugal
Defunct constitutions
20th century in Portugal
1910s in Portugal
1920s in Portugal
1911 documents